Cook County was one of the original Nineteen Counties in New South Wales and is now one of the 141 Cadastral divisions of New South Wales. It includes the area to the west of Sydney in the Blue Mountains, between the Colo River in the north, and the Coxs River in the south and west, encompassing Lithgow, Mount Victoria, Katoomba, Wentworth Falls, Lawson and most of the other towns in the Blue Mountains. The Nepean River is the border to the east. Before 1834, the area was part of the Westmoreland, Northumberland and Roxburgh counties.

Cook County was named in honour of the navigator James Cook (1728–1779). The Electoral district of Cook and Westmoreland was the first state electoral district for the area, between 1856 and 1859.

Parishes within this county
A full list of parishes found within this county; their current LGA and mapping coordinates to the approximate centre of each location is as follows:

References

Counties of New South Wales